Associazione Sportiva Dilettantistica Ferentino Calcio was an Italian association football club located in Ferentino, Lazio.

History 
The club was foundend in 1931.

In the last its season 2008–09 it was relegated from Serie D/G to Eccellenza Lazio.

The transfer to Ceccano 
In summer 2009 the side, after the merger with Associazione Sportiva Ceccano, transferred the seat and its sports title of Eccellenza to the city of Ceccano becoming Associazione Sportiva Dilettantistica Ceccano. Because of this merger, Ferentino has effectively disappeared from the Italian football panorama.

Colors and badge
Its colors were all-dark red and white.

External links
Associazione Proloco Ferentino Site

Football clubs in Italy
Association football clubs established in 1931
Association football clubs disestablished in 2009
Football clubs in Lazio
1931 establishments in Italy
2009 disestablishments in Italy